9th Mission Support Command activated the 303rd Maneuver Enhancement Brigade at Fort Shafter Flats, Hawaii, on 22 January 2011.

References

Maneuver Enhancement Brigades of the United States Army
Military units and formations established in 2011